Rumford is an unincorporated community in Fall River County, South Dakota, United States. Rumford is not tracked by the Census Bureau and shares a ZIP code (57735) with Edgemont and other surrounding towns and rural areas.

Rumford was founded in 1889 when Burlington Northern extended the railroad line and built a station at this location. The railroad company changed the name from Siding No. 5 to Rumford in 1894.

References in popular culture

Banjo Dan and the Mid-nite Plowboys included the song "Rumford, South Dakota, is No More" on their 1974 "Snowfall" album.

References

Unincorporated communities in Fall River County, South Dakota
Unincorporated communities in South Dakota